Herman Kelly & Life were a late-1970s modern soul/funk group based in Miami, Florida. Their most notable track, "Dance to the Drummer Beat", was originally released in 1978 on numerous American and European labels with various mixes and time-lengths. Due to a typographical error, the title of the song was mislabeled as "Dance To The Drummer Beat" on both the Audio Latino and Electric Cat releases. Additionally, the track has appeared on various compilation releases including the heavily sampled breakbeat album entitled Ultimate Breaks and Beats popular among deejays and hip-hop artists. Members of the Life Group were John Demonica, Michael Cordoza, Oliver Wells,Travis Biggs, and lead vocalist Aaron(Jelly)McCarthy. The record and album was sampled and promoted worldwide from 1978-1980.

Select US discography
Albums
1978 ‒ Percussion Explosion LP ‒ Electric Cat (ECS-225)
1978 ‒ Percussion Explosion LP ‒ Alston (ALS-4409)

Singles
1978 ‒ "Dance To The Drummer Beat/Noches Eternas" 7" ‒ Audio Latino (RCAL-598)
1978 ‒ "Easy Going/Dance To The Drummer Beat" 7" ‒ Electric Cat (EC-1700)
1978 ‒ "Dance To The Drummer Beat (Disco Version)/Easy Going (Noches Eternas) (Disco Version)" 12" ‒ Electric Cat (DEC-1701)
1978 ‒ "Dance To The Drummer's Beat/Easy Going" 7" ‒ Alston (ALS-3742)
1978 ‒ "Dance To The Drummer's Beat/Easy Going" 12" ‒ T.K. Disco (TKD-100)

References

American funk musical groups